SCM Politehnica Timișoara is a team handball club from Timișoara, Romania, that plays in the Romanian Handball League.

Kits

Achievements
Romanian League (in 11 players)
Winners: 1956
Romanian League:
Winners: 1991 
Romanian Cup:
Winners: 1986, 2019
Runners-up: 1983, 1988, 2018

European record

Team

Current squad 
Squad for the 2020–2021 season

Goalkeepers
 1  Cristian Tcaciuc
 12  Aleksandar Milenković
 16  Claudiu Pal

Wingers
Right Wingers
 30  Flavius Cîmpan
 94  Robert Năstăsie
Left Wingers
 7  Sérgio Barros 
 9  Denis Neamțu

Line players
 23  Călin Dedu
 24  Bogdan Baican
 61  Constantin Enculescu

Back players
Right Backs
 15  Marius Sadoveac
 33  Savo Slavuljica
Centre Backs
 10  Aron Dedu
 34  Cristian Fenici
Left Backs
 2  Andrei Păiuș
 19  Ramon Șomlea
 21  Liviu Caba

Notable players
  Nicolae Popescu
  Ghennadii Solomon
  Roland Gunnesch
   Herbert Müller
  Alexandru Buligan
  Alexandru Dedu
  Alexandru Șimicu
  Marius Sadoveac
  Demis Grigoraș
  Diliță Adrian

External links
Club website

Romanian handball clubs
Sport in Timișoara
Handball clubs established in 1947
1947 establishments in Romania
Liga Națională (men's handball)